Oudewater is a municipality and a town in the Netherlands.

History 
The origin of the town of Oudewater is obscure and no information has been found concerning the first settlement of citizens. It is also difficult to recover the name of Oudewater. One explanation is that the name is a corruption of old water-meadow. Oudewater was an important border city between Holland and Utrecht. Oudewater (lit. "Old water") was of great strategic importance.

The town was granted city rights in 1265 by Hendrik van Vianden, the bishop of Utrecht.

Oudewater took its place in the First Free States council in Dordrecht on 19 July 1572, Oudewater was one of the twelve cities taking part in the first free convention of the States General in Dordrecht. This was a meeting that laid down the origin of the State of the Netherlands, as we know it now, under the leadership of the House of Orange. This happened at the beginning of the Eighty Years' War (1568–1648) when the Netherlands were still part of the Spanish Empire. After a Siege of Oudewater, the city was conquered by the Spanish on 7 August 1575, and most of its inhabitants were killed, including the family of famous Oudewater native and Protestant theologian Jacobus Arminius (1560-1609).

In the 16th and 17th century, Oudewater was an important producer of rope. In the surrounding area, hemp was cultivated. There still is a rope manufacturing plant and a rope museum in the town.

In 1970 the municipality of Oudewater moved from the province of South Holland to the province of Utrecht.

Geography 
It is situated where the Linschoten river flows out in the Hollandse IJssel.

Oudewater is bordered by the municipalities of Montfoort (in the northeast), Lopik (southeast), Krimpenerwaard (southwest), and Bodegraven-Reeuwijk (northwest).

The municipality of Oudewater consists of the following cities, towns, villages and/or districts: Diemerbroek, Hekendorp, Hoenkoop, Lange Linschoten, Oudewater, Papekop, Ruigeweide, and Snelrewaard.

Buildings 

Oudewater is famous for the Heksenwaag (Witches' scales). This Weighing house, an official town building, became famous at the height of the European witch trials of the 16th century because people accused of witchcraft were offered a fair chance to prove their innocence as opposed to many other places where the scales were rigged. 

From all over Europe people made the journey to Oudewater to avoid prosecution. After the weighing, they received an official certificate proclaiming them not a witch. Nobody was ever found to be an actual witch in Oudewater, though the weighings were still a public spectacle. Certificates would state that "the body weight is in proportion to its build." The reasoning behind this is the old belief that a witch has no soul and therefore weighs significantly less than an ordinary person; this distinction would supposedly allow the witch to fly on a broomstick. 

In early modern times, when accusations of witchcraft could result in being burned at the stake, the town of Oudewater offered the accused a chance of proving their innocence. This can be seen as a sign of the growing power of the citizenry as a third force next to that of the church and nobility. Before witch hunts were sanctioned by the law and the church in their bid to break the power of local herb doctors and midwives. By giving out these certificates the citizens of Oudewater, therefore were defying the church. 

The Waag is still open as a tourist attraction, and official certificates are available. 

The town hall dates from 1588 and features a stork's nest. Oudewater has a monumental protected city centre with more than 250 protected houses. The church, now Protestant, dates from the 15th century. Its tower is from about 1300. During the religious wars, until the sacking of Oudewater, both Roman Catholics and Protestants used this church. Thereafter Catholics were still tolerated (the Spanish occupiers being Catholic) but more in low profile.

In fiction 

Oudewater is the setting for the 1975 novel Das Geheimnis des Baron Oudewater set in the 16th century, when the Netherlands was fighting for its independence from Spain. Written by the German author Alberta Rommel, it has been described as a romantic historical novel.

The 2014 film Reckless was filmed in Oudewater.

Notable people 

 Albert van Ouwater (ca.1410/1415 – 1475) an early artist of Early Netherlandish painting working in the Northern Netherlands
 Gerard David (ca.1460–1523) an Early Netherlandish painter and manuscript illuminator, used brilliant colour
 Rudolph Snellius (1546–1613) a Dutch linguist and mathematician, a political and intellectual force of the Dutch Golden Age
 Jacobus Arminius (1560–1609) a Dutch theologian, formed Arminianism and the Dutch Remonstrant movement
 Hendrikus Albertus Lorentz (1871–1944) a Dutch explorer in New Guinea and diplomat in South Africa
 Jan Montyn (1924–2015) a Dutch artist, specialized in etching
 Wim Klever (born 1930 in Snelrewaard) a Dutch scholar of the Jewish Dutch philosopher Baruch Spinoza
 Dirk de Ridder (born 1972) a sailor, competed at the 2000 Summer Olympics

Image gallery

References

External links 

 
 Tourist information
 Museum de Heksenwaag
 

 
Populated places in Utrecht (province)
Municipalities of Utrecht (province)
Former municipalities of South Holland
Cities in the Netherlands